Forbasy is a village and municipality in Stará Ľubovňa District in the Prešov Region of northern Slovakia.

History
The village was first mentioned in 1311

Geography
The municipality lies at an altitude of 540 metres and covers an area of 4.498 km². It has a population of about 390 people.

Genealogical resources

The records for genealogical research are available at the state archive "Statny Archiv in Levoca, Slovakia"

 Roman Catholic church records (births/marriages/deaths): 1624-1945 (parish B)

See also
 List of municipalities and towns in Slovakia

External links
https://web.archive.org/web/20070927203415/http://www.statistics.sk/mosmis/eng/run.html
Surnames of living people in Forbasy

Villages and municipalities in Stará Ľubovňa District